Alexander Gordon Shirley (31 October 1921 – April 1990) was a Scottish professional footballer who played as a winger.

Career
Born in Milngavie, Shirley played for Dundee United, New Brighton, Bradford City, Mansfield Town and Ashton United.

References

1921 births
1990 deaths
Scottish footballers
Dundee United F.C. players
New Brighton A.F.C. players
Bradford City A.F.C. players
Mansfield Town F.C. players
Ashton United F.C. players
English Football League players
Association football wingers